The Alchemist is the third and final album by British rock band Home, released in 1973 on the CBS Records label. After the group disbanded in 1974, Cliff Williams went on to join Bandit from 1975 to 1977 before he replaced Mark Evans in Australian hard rock band AC/DC. Guitarist Laurie Wisefield went on to achieve success with the British band Wishbone Ash from 1974 to 1985. The record also featured Jimmy Anderson on keyboards. Though the album was loved by the critics, it did not sell well commercially.

Track listing 
The story was written by Micky Stubbs and David Skillen. Lyrics by David Skillen. Music by Home.
"Schooldays" – 2:57
"The Old Man Dying" – 3:47
"Time Passes By" – 2:05
"The Old Man Calling (Save the People)" – 3:15
"The Disaster"– 2:36
"The Sun's Revenge" – 4:00
"A Secret to Keep" – 1:18
"The Brass Band Played" – 1:25
"Rejoicing" – 2:49
"The Disaster Returns (Devastation)" – 8:03
"The Death of the Alchemist" – 4:35
"The Alchemist" – 3:48

Esoteric remaster (2010) bonus tracks 
"Green Eyed Fairy"
"Sister Rosalie"
"Hayward Town (previously unreleased)"

Personnel 
Home
 Mick Stubbs – lead vocals, guitars, piano
 Laurie Wisefield – lead, acoustic and steel guitars, vocals
 Jimmy Anderson – keyboards, synthesizer, vocals
 Cliff Williams – bass guitar, vocals
 Mick "Cookie" Cook – drums, various percussion
Technical
John Anthony, Pat Moran, Mike Stone, Ted Sharp - engineer

References

External links 
 The Alchemist album releases at Discogs.com
 The Alchemist album review, credits & releases at AllMusic.com

1973 albums
Albums produced by John Anthony (record producer)
CBS Records albums
Albums recorded at Rockfield Studios
Albums recorded at Trident Studios